Vaqasluy-e Sofla (also Romanized as Vaqāşlūy-e Soflá; also known as Kachal‘alī-ye Soflá and Vaqāşlū-ye Soflá) is a village in Nazlu-e Shomali Rural District, Nazlu District, Urmia County, West Azerbaijan Province, Iran. At the 2006 census, its population was 516, in 116 families.

References 

Populated places in Urmia County